Otto Oeldenberger was a German professional footballer who played as a forward for 1860 Munich. He played in the finals of the 1931 German football championship and was part of the 1940–41 Gauliga Bayern championship team.

References

German footballers
Association football forwards
TSV 1860 Munich players